Endangered Species is the eighth album by American Southern rock band Lynyrd Skynyrd. It was released in 1994 and features mostly acoustic instrumentation, as well as Ronnie Van Zant's younger brother, Johnny, as lead vocalist. Many of the songs are Lynyrd Skynyrd's best known songs, with new material released alongside. This is the last album to feature guitarist Ed King and the only one to feature guitarist Mike Estes.

Track listing
"Down South Jukin'" (Gary Rossington, Ronnie Van Zant) – 2:38
"Heartbreak Hotel" (Mae Boren Axton, Tommy Durden, Elvis Presley) – 4:01
"Devil in the Bottle" (Mike Estes, Dale Krantz-Rossington, Rossington, Johnny Van Zant) – 3:35
"Things Goin' On" (Rossington, R. Van Zant) – 3:00
"Saturday Night Special" (Ed King, R. Van Zant) – 3:53
"Sweet Home Alabama" (King, Rossington, R. Van Zant) – 4:01
"I Ain't the One" (Rossington, R. Van Zant) – 3:27
"Am I Losin'" (Rossington, R. Van Zant) – 4:06
"All I Have Is a Song" (Rossington, J. Van Zant) – 3:21
"Poison Whiskey" (King, R. Van Zant) – 2:47
"Good Luck, Bad Luck" (Estes, King) – 3:23
"The Last Rebel" (Michael Lunn, Rossington, J. Van Zant, Robert White Johnson) – 5:42
"Hillbilly Blues" (Estes, King, Rossington, J. Van Zant) – 3:42

Personnel
Lynyrd Skynyrd
Johnny Van Zant – vocals
Gary Rossington – guitar, acoustic guitar
Mike Estes – guitar, acoustic guitar
Leon Wilkeson – bass, background vocals
Billy Powell – piano
Owen Hale – percussion, drums
Ed King – guitar, mandolin, acoustic guitar

Additional personnel
Dale Krantz-Rossington – background vocals, vocals
Debbie Davis – background vocals

Chart positions

References

1994 albums
Lynyrd Skynyrd albums
Albums produced by Barry Beckett
Capricorn Records albums